Vincisgrassi, also spelled vincesgrassi, is a typical Marche pasta dish similar to lasagne al forno, considered one of the gastronomic emblems of the Marche cuisine.

Vincisgrassi are flat pasta (usually made with 100 grams of flour for each egg), a meat sauce called ragù (in this recipe, differently from other ragùs; the variety of meats is coarsely chopped and mixed with cloves, celery, onion, carrot, chicken giblets, tomatoes and white wine) and Béchamel sauce with much nutmeg.

Origins and history

According to tradition, the Italian name of the dish derives from simplification and Italianization of the name of the general Alfred von Windisch-Grätz who defeated the Napoleonic troops in the siege of Ancona in 1799. A lady from Ancona prepared this dish in his honor. The general appreciated the dish so much that the population decided to name it for him. 
It is not clear, however, if the dish was invented in honor of the general or if it was a dish already known at the time that was dedicated to him. 
In  (The cook from Macerata), a book of 1779, Antonio Nebbia describes the preparation of particular lasagna called "princisgrass" with a richer recipe. So, probably, the dish was already present in the culinary tradition of the Marche, and in particular of Macerata.

Traditional Speciality Guaranteed
Since 2022, in the EU the Vincisgrassi alla maceratese (from Macerata) has been registered as a Traditional Speciality Guaranteed.

See also

 Baked ziti
 List of Italian dishes
 Timballo – an Italian casserole

References 

Pasta dishes
Meat dishes
Italian cuisine
Cuisine of Marche
Cuisine of Umbria